Francesco "Ciccio" Tavano (born 2 March 1979) is an Italian football coach and former striker. He is currently in charge as head coach of Eccellenza amateurs Tuttocuoio.

Playing career 
Tavano started his professional career with Pisa, before being sold to minor Florence team Rondinella, then in Serie C2. He then joined Empoli, where he slowly established himself as one of the stars of the small Tuscan team. During the January 2006 transfer window, several Italian football pundits claimed that Real Madrid were interested in signing Tavano, but he eventually signed for Valencia in mid-2006, for €9 million. He received a call-up from the Italian national team in April 2006, when manager Marcello Lippi held trials for the 23-man squad that would go on to win the 2006 FIFA World Cup, but he never made his international debut.

His time in Spain, however, proved to be unsuccessful, as he fell out with coaching staff after making statements in the press which led to him being a sub player for the majority of his short stay in Spain. Tavano then returned to Italy for a loan spell with Roma, where he mostly served as a reserve player for the main giallorossi strikers, although he was able to win the 2006–07 Coppa Italia with the club.

In 2007, he was permanently signed by Livorno, for a reported €5.5 million on a four-year contract. He received the number 10 jersey, previously retired in honour of Igor Protti and unretired that year under explicit request from the former amaranto star. Despite being the club top scorer in his comeback season in Tuscany, his side did not manage to escape from relegation. Tavano agreed to stay at Livorno also in their 2008–09 Serie B campaign in order to try to lead his team back into the top flight.

He scored a hat-trick against Avellino on the opening day of the season, making it the first round 1 hat-trick since 1994. He would then score at Piacenza, before standing back to back with a teammate in celebration. He missed a penalty against his former club Empoli with the score tied at 1–1, before Antonio Busce scored Empoli's winner. Tavano would, however, get a goal in the 5–2 win over Frosinone, on the way to 25 for the season, giving him the capocannoniere title, and ensuring promotion through the playoffs after missing out on automatic promotion to Bari and Parma. However, he had a hard season in Serie A, as Livorno were the only newly promoted team to go down. He scored the winner at Roma, but only scored four more goals.

He retired in 2022 after starting the season with Eccellenza Tuscany amateurs Tuttocuoio, at the age of 43.

Coaching career
On 15 November 2022, Tavano took on his first head coaching role, in charge of Eccellenza Tuscany club Tuttocuoio, for which he was playing before, therefore forcing him to quit his playing career as a consequence.

Honours
Roma
Coppa Italia: 2006–07

References

External links 

1979 births
Living people
People from Caserta
Italian footballers
Association football forwards
Serie A players
Serie B players
Serie C players
La Liga players
Empoli F.C. players
U.S. Avellino 1912 players
Valencia CF players
A.S. Roma players
U.S. Livorno 1915 players
Carrarese Calcio players
Pisa S.C. players
Italian expatriate footballers
Italian expatriate sportspeople in Spain
Expatriate footballers in Spain
Footballers from Campania
Sportspeople from the Province of Caserta
Italian football managers